Malerba is a surname. Notable people with the surname include:

Alfredo Malerba (1909–1994), Argentine pianist and musician
Franco Malerba (born 1946), Italian astronaut
Joseph Malerba (born 1962), French actor
Luigi Malerba (1927–2008), Italian novelist and screenwriter
Marilynn Malerba, lifetime chief of the Mohegan Tribe and the 45th treasurer of the United States (designate)

See also
9897 Malerba, a main-belt asteroid, named after Franco Malerba